Carolyn Jones (1930–1983) was an American actress.

Carole, Caroline or Carolyn Jones may also refer to:

Media personalities
Caroline Jones (broadcaster) (1938–2022), Australian radio and television news personality
Carolyn Jones (British actress) (1941–2018), played Sharon Metcalfe on Crossroads from 1977 to 1984
Caroline R. Jones (1942–2001), African American pioneering advertising agency founder
Carole Ann Jones (1942–2019), birth name of American actress Carol Lynley
Carolyn Jones (filmmaker) (born 1957), American director, writer, producer and photographer
Carolyn Jones, American winner of 1977 National Sweetheart beauty pageant
Caroline Jones (born 1960), birth name of English actress and television presenter Caroline Quentin
Caroline Jones (singer) (born 1990), American country music songwriter and radio host

Others
Caroline Jones (humanitarian) (1808–1877), English immigration and welfare reformer in Australia
Caroline A. Jones (born 1954), American art historian, author, curator and academic
Caroline Jones (politician) (born 1955), Welsh independent Member of the Senedd
Carolyn Jones (politician), Canadian legislator in Saskatchewan from 1999 to 2003
Carolyn Jones (basketball) (born 1969), American guard for Auburn and Portland Fire

See also
Caroline Johns (1940–2012), English actress who played Liz Shaw on Doctor Who a/k/a Caroline John
Carolyn Johns, Australian performer, since 2007, in musical comedy trio The Kransky Sisters